Andre Mijatović (born 3 December 1979) is a Croatian former professional footballer who played as a defender.

Career
Mijatović was born in Rijeka, SR Croatia, SFR Yugoslavia and started his career at the local club HNK Rijeka, where he became a member of the first team in the summer of 1998. He subsequently spent five seasons with the club and was a regular in every of the five seasons, making a total of 122 appearances and scoring 10 goals for the club in the Croatian First League. He also made a total of 10 appearances and scored three goals for Rijeka in European international club competitions during the club's participations in the UEFA Champions League qualifying in 1999 and the UEFA Cup in the early 2000s.

During his time with Rijeka, Mijatović also earned himself a place in the Croatian national under-21 team, for which he won a total of 10 international caps between April 1999 and June 2001. He made his debut for the team at the 1999 World Youth Championship in Nigeria, where he played all 90 minutes in every of the four matches played by the Croatian team at the tournament before they were eliminated in the round of 16. He also made four appearances for the team in their qualifying campaign for the 2002 European Under-21 Championship.

At club level, Mijatović left Rijeka for Dinamo Zagreb in the summer of 2003 and subsequently played two seasons for the club as a regular in their team, making a total of 51 appearances and scoring one goal in the Croatian First League. He also won the Croatian Cup with Dinamo in 2004 and played in the UEFA Cup in both of the two seasons with the club, making a total of eight appearances and scoring once as he netted the second goal in Dinamo's 6–1 victory over KSK Beveren on 4 November 2004.

In the summer of 2005, Mijatović left Dinamo for German 2. Bundesliga side SpVgg Greuther Fürth and became a regular in the team from the beginning, although his 2. Bundesliga debut against Dynamo Dresden on 6 August 2005 was not entirely successful as he was sent off after receiving two yellow cards. He went on to make 30 out of possible 34 appearances his first season with Greuther Fürth and also scored three goals for the club in the league, first of them being in a 2–2 draw away against Wacker Burghausen on 17 March 2006.

In July 2007, he moved to Bundesliga team Arminia Bielefeld, where he was a regular in the first team. After three seasons in Bielefeld, he left Arminia to join the newly relegated Hertha BSC. He captained the Berlin club to a first-place finish, leading to its immediate return to the top-flight, but was relegated again the following season.

Career statistics

Club

Honours
Dinamo Zagreb
Croatian Cup: 2003–04
Croatian Super Cup: 2003

Hertha BSC
2. Bundesliga: 2010–11

FC Ingolstadt
2. Bundesliga: 2014–15

References

External links
 

1979 births
Living people
Footballers from Rijeka
Association football defenders
Croatian footballers
Croatia under-21 international footballers
HNK Rijeka players
GNK Dinamo Zagreb players
SpVgg Greuther Fürth players
Arminia Bielefeld players
Hertha BSC players
FC Ingolstadt 04 players
Croatian Football League players
Bundesliga players
2. Bundesliga players
Croatian expatriate footballers
Expatriate footballers in Germany
Croatian expatriate sportspeople in Germany